Zouzou may refer to:

 Zouzou (model) (Danièle Ciarlet), model, actress and singer
 Zouzou (film), 1934 film directed by Marc Allégret
 Zouzous, a French children's programming block